The Jatiya Party is a conservative, nationalist political party in Bangladesh and is currently the main opposition in the Jatiya Sangsad, against the Awami League. The current chairman of the party is Ghulam Muhammad Quader. On 3 January 2019, the party announced its decision to join the Bangladesh Awami League-led Grand Alliance after having been in opposition for the previous parliamentary term. However, the party backtracked the next day and announced that it intended to remain part of the opposition. Currently, it holds Rangpur out of Bangladesh's 12 city corporations.

History
The party was established by a retired army officer, Hussain Mohammad Ershad on 1 January 1986. He was the Chief of Army Staff of Bangladesh Army. He had seized power through a coup d'état on 24 March 1982. He ruled the country as chief martial law administrator till December 1983. Politics was banned during the state of emergency imposed by Ershad, when Justice A. F. M. Ahsanuddin Chowdhury was appointed President of Bangladesh. The Janadal Party was formed under the leadership of A. F. M. Ahsanuddin Chowdhury, through Ershads declaration of the 19-point programme on 17 March 1983.

Chowdhury announced the formation of Janadal on 27 November 1983. Chowdhury was the convenor and MA Matin as general secretary. When Ershad became president, Mizanur Rahman Chowdhury was named chairman and Riazuddin Ahmed (also known as Bhola Mia, in his area) the general secretary. Ershad formed a second political party, Jatiya Front, under the Bangladesh Nationalist Party politician Shah Azizur Rahman, with members of Janadal and Muslim League, the Ganatantri Dal, United Peoples Party. Moudud Ahmed, and Anwar Hossain Manju joined Jatiya Front. The front was dissolved in six months and a new political party called Jatiya Party was formed on 1 January 1986 with Ershad as its chairman.

On 7 May 1986 elections, the Jatiya Party won 153 seats in the national elections. The election was viewed as neither neutral nor fair. On 15 October 1986, Ershad was elected President of Bangladesh. Protests for democracy gained momentum in 1987. Consequently, Ershad dissolved the Jatiya Sangsad on 6 December 1987. In the elections for the fourth Jatiya Sangsad held on 3 March 1988, the Jatiya Party secured 251 seats, while other major political parties, including the BNP and the Awami League, boycotted the election. Ershad resigned in December 1990 in the face of rising protest and international pressure.

Ershad handed power over to Justice Shahabuddin Ahmed, on 6 December 1991. Ershad was arrested, and his deputy, Mizanur Rahman Chowdhury became the acting chairman. On 27 February 1991 national election, the Jatiya Party won the third largest number of seats, 35 seats in the parliament. Jatiya Party won 32 seats in the parliamentary elections held on 12 June 1996 under the caretaker government (CTG). Jatiya Party joined the Bangladesh Awami League led cabinet. Anwar Hossain Manju, the secretary general of Jatiya, was included in the cabinet of Sheikh Hasina as Minister of Communication. Jatiya party splintered in three groups by 2000, this fraction was led by General Ershad, another led by Anwar Hossain Manju and Bangladesh Jatiya Party led by Naziur Rahman Manzur. In the 2001 parliamentary election the fraction led by Ershad won 14 seats, while the fraction led by Anwar Hossain won one seat. 2014 Election was a controversial election for Jatiya Party where Ershad's spokesperson Bobby Hajjaj publicly declared that Jatiya Party would not participate in the election. After the 2014 election, Ershad became the special envoy of Prime Minister Sheikh Hasina in the Bangladesh Awami League led government. Jatiya Party became the opposition party and Rowshan Ershad, Ershad's wife, became the leader of the opposition. Despite being in the opposition party some leaders of Jatiya Party are also in the government cabinet. In January 2016, Ershad's brother, GM Quader, was made vice chairman of the party. In April 2016 Ershad appointed Rowshan as the vice-chairman of the party. In March 2017, Ershad indicated he might form a new political alliance with 14 other parties. For the next general election however, the Jatiya Party under HM Ershad formed a 58 party grand alliance of its own. Of the 58 parties, only Jatiya Party and Bangladesh Islamic Front have registration with the election commission as of 2017.

Student front
Jatiya Chatra Samaj is the student front of the party. It had celebrated Ershad's birthday in Madhu's Canteen at Dhaka University in March 2017, the same location in which pro-democracy protests against Ershad were organised during his rule.

Central Committee Member

Electoral history

Presidential elections

Jatiya Sangsad elections

See also
 Grand Alliance (Bangladesh)
 Jatiya Party (Manju)
 Bangladesh Jatiya Party – BJP

References

External links

 
1986 establishments in Bangladesh
Conservative parties in Asia
Liberal parties in Asia
National liberal parties
Political parties established in 1986
Political parties in Bangladesh